Han Shizhong (1089–1151) was a Chinese military general, poet, and politician of the late Northern Song Dynasty and the early  Southern Song Dynasty. He dedicated his whole life to serving the Song Dynasty, and performed many legendary deeds. It is said that he had scars all over his body and, by the time he retired, there were only four fingers left on both of his hands. General Han distinguished himself in the Jin–Song wars against the Jurchen Jin Dynasty, and was reputed to win battles in situation where he had to face a larger number of enemies with a smaller numbers of soldiers. He was a great fighter and because of his feats in battle, Yuan Tan said that Han Shizhong was truly an even match for 10,000 men.

He was also known as a military inventor: his inventions including various modified bows, chain-like armor, a horse jumping obstacle course for cavalry training, and an archery range for archery practice. His wife, Liang Hongyu, was also known to have an exceptional military mind.

Through the tragedy of Yue Fei's execution, Han realized the extent of the rampant corruption throughout the Song imperial court, and retired from military service afterward.

Early life 
Han Shizhong was born to a poor farming family in a village of the Shanxi province in the year 1089. He was born in a time when China was under constant threats by stronger bordering nations: notably the Tanguts' Xi Xia,the Khitans' Liao Empire and the  Jurchens' Jin Empire. In 1105, the Tanguts' kingdom of Xi Xia attacked China and Han Shizhong was conscripted into military service.

Early military career 
In the war against Xi Xia, Han Shizhong distinguished himself by slaying an enemy officer in battle and was given a rank. These achievements were followed by greater successes, and he was hence promoted to lieutenant. Han led Song Jiang's army offensive against the Liao and these stories were written in the Water Margin. The war between Song China and Xi Xia emerged into a war of a larger scale when the powerful Jin and Liao entered and supported different sides (Jin and Song; Liao and Xi Xia). It ended when the Jin emerged victorious over the Liao armies. Despite a victory against their enemies, the Song government had little to celebrate as peasant rebellions began to plague their land. In AD 1120, Han was sent as a deputy of General Wang Yuan to suppress a local rebellion. It was reputed that he alone infiltrated a rebels' stronghold and captured the leader. Han was nicknamed, "Able to defeat ten thousands" and was rewarded handsomely for his efforts.

Meeting with Liang Hongyu 
A banquet was soon held in Han's honor for this success. During this banquet, Han met his future wife, Liang Hongyu. Liang Hongyu was a military courtesan and was serving the officers in the banquet. It is said that Liang caught the eye of Han who was sighing instead of celebrating like the others. Liang approached Han and asked him why he wasn't showing any signs of joy in the banquet which was thrown in his honor. Han replied that this was a small victory and that he was worried about the Jurchens who showed signs of hostility to the Song regime. He stated that it hurt him to imagine the damage that war may bring upon the peasants. Liang was in awe of Han, and the two quickly become very close to each another. Liang decided to follow Han and the two soon were married.

Jurchen invasions

The First Invasion of the Jurchens 
Soon, Han's greatest fear approached as the Jurchens betrayed its alliance with Song and attacked the Song army by surprise. Han was enlisted with the many deputies under General Liang Fongping. He was given fifty cavalry to take back the fortress of Yishan from the Jurchens. Many regarded this as a suicidal assault since there were over 2000 experienced Jin troops guarding it. However, Liang enforced the idea, and Han didn't reject it. Miraculously, Han emerged victorious over the Jurchens. Yet, Han had no time to celebrate as all the other armies under Liang had been routed by Jurchens.

The Second Invasion of the Jurchens 
In 1125, the Jin army destroyed the Liao Empire and swiftly destroyed the forces of Xi Xia and Goryeo (both allies of Liao), making them vassal states of the Jin Empire. That very same year, the Jurchens assembled a large coalition force consisting of Jurchens, Tanguts, Khitans and Koreans to launch a second invasion of China. Han was defending the city of Zhaozhou once again under General Wang Yuan (Chinese:王淵). After a few months of battle, the city's logistical supplies dwindled. Han asked for three hundred cavalrymen and, one night, made a surprise attack on the enemy encampment. This attack caught the Jurchens by surprise and they began to scramble and swing their swords on anyone they saw. By daybreak, many of them had trampled over one another; amongst those fatalities was the commander of the invading Jurchen force. The Jurchens had no choice but to retreat. Thus was the city of Zhaozhou relieved. Despite this victory, most other Song defending forces, again, were defeated, and the Jurchens even captured two Song emperors. In AD 1127, Han was given a thousand-man army to escort the crown prince Zhao Gou, Primce of Kang (趙構, 亦称康王) to safety in southern China. He was checked by an army ten times larger but, once again, emerged victorious and forced the enemy to retreat. The crown prince who would become Emperor Gaozong successfully reached Henan, ascended the throne and established the Southern Song Dynasty. Shortly after in 1127 or 1128, the capital was moved to Yangzhou.

Han advised Emperor Gaozong to recover the lost lands in the North, but Gaozong, content with simply being emperor, neglected his advice. Meanwhile, under siege, the Chinese general guarding the northern capital, Kaifeng, was so angered that he felt ill knowing no reinforcements would be sent, and died shortly after. The city was surrendered shortly after, in 1128.

The Third Invasion of the Jurchens 
The Fall of Kaifeng boosted the morale of the Jurchens, and they attempted a third invasion. Gaozong saw little intention to make a good defense against the Jurchens. He felt the strong generals around him would make him vulnerable and wanted them to lose to remove the threat. Han facing enormous odds, was beaten off for the first time. Many of the Song generals, disgusted by the cowardly emperor, began to retaliate, and Han had to gather up what was left of his force and protect the throne. He successfully captured the renegade generals and scattered their forces. It is stated that Han actually condemned the emperor and that the emperor apologized and finally showed signs of better supporting the generals defending China.

Despite early successes of the Jurchens, the Jurchens was beaten off by another general, Yue Fei, in a series of battles. The Jurchens under a crowned prince Jin Wuzhu, with a large force of hundred thousand force, decided to avoid Yue and took a route to cross and invade the capital and abduct another emperor. A force consisting of local militias and a few well trained soldiers was assembled in a mountain near the Yangtse River, and Han along with his wife hurried to take command of it. In his journey, he stayed in a local temple where he came face to face with a few Jin Generals and over a hundred Jurchen warriors. Despite the fact that Han only had a few guards and his wife along with him, they managed to fend the enemy off and took the heads of some Jin Generals. The group arrived shortly at the mouth of the river.

The Battle of Huangtiandang 
In the battle that soon took place, known as the Battle of Huangtiandang (黃天蕩), the outnumbered Chinese forces stayed quiet for a while. Han gave the false impression that his soldiers had to retreat to a temple up a mountain, which the Jurchens thought of as a time when they could easily captured him. However, it was a trap that Han deployed for them. As the Jurchen commander Jin Wuzhu (金兀术) entered the temple, he was surrounded by a few well trained riders, and he and men in his group were completely cut off from the others by Chinese troops hiding in the road up the mountain. This led to a popular saying of the time, " a hundred thousand lured to a trap, and it takes only eight thousand riders to cut them off." 十萬敵兵來假道，八千驍騎截中流.

The Jin navy on the river was checked by a new invention of the Chinese, the tiger ship, which could spill fire from its front using flamethrowing technology imported from the Middle East by way of Arab mariners.  They attacked after hearing the signal of  Liang Hongyu who beat the wardrums in a hill nearby. The tiger ships quickly pierced the Jin ships, and the Jin navy was close to being routed by their enemies. The Jurchens were trapped for forty days wherein almost half their force was routed; and, the Jin prince who commanded the Jurchen army even sent messengers to the Chinese commander and offered bribes to beg for mercy. Han ignored the request. Eventually the Jurchens escaped through a hole in Han's encirclement due to the lack of soldiers—the weakness was revealed by a Song traitor. Even so, the Jurchens was checked by General Yue Fei and almost entirely routed before they get back to Jin territory. The third invasion was again a military disaster for the Jurchens.

The Fourth Invasion of the Jurchens 
The Jurchens again assembled another force in 1137, consisting of seventy thousand men and began the fourth invasion. Losing many experienced soldiers through the previous invasions, the Jurchens this time had poorer results and after a few battles were almost completely routed. The Chinese force under Yue Fei and Han Shizhong quickly took advantage of the situation and began a counterattack. The Song were victorious in a number of battles including the Battle of Yancheng in 1139. Less than a year afterwards, Song troops almost reached the Jin capital.

Later part of his life 

The night before they entered the Jin Capital, the emperor of China was worried about saving the two previous emperors in the Jin Capital and ordered the generals to come back. The generals avoided the idea at first, but the emperor began to send more letters and even threatened killing the soldiers' families. Yue Fei in tears stated, "Thirty years of effort now is wasted." The generals were ordered back to the imperial court, and this time met with chancellor Qin Hui and many of the officials and generals who supported the peace policy of the court. They imprisoned General Yue Fei and were about to sentence him when Han Shizhong asked Qin Hui, "Upon what charges?". Qin Hui simply stated, "For Yue's guilt, No evidence needed? (其事体莫須有)" (it has become a famous proverb for 'trumped-up charge' in Chinese language). Han then replied, "How can you satisfy people's demand for justice with a logical fallacy such as 'No evidence needed?'" Later, Han was so outraged than he laughed and threw his helmet and sword, which were both symbols of the authority of a Chinese general, at him. He attacked the emperor and Qin Hui with these insulting words: "They brought their nations into ruins, and there will no longer be any more able generals that will fight for the Song." Originally Qin wanted to kill Han next, but Han saved the emperor in a past battle, so Han was allowed to live.

Great but sad friendship 
Soon, he retired from military service and when General Yue was executed, he neglected an imperial edict to arrest Yue's family, and instead escorted the Yue family to safety. He and his family retreated into the rural areas and he died in 1151.  His body is buried next to Liang Hongyu's grave.

People often saw Han riding a donkey along the West Lake, take a bottle of wine, sit, and sprinkle a bit of it upon Yue's grave. He would speak to Yue in a soft and emotional way, regardless of the weather; rain or snow.

Achievements 
Han Shizhong was credited with many military inventions including various modified armor and bows, horse jumping obstacles that trained cavalry, and an archery range to train the accuracy of archers and mounted archers.

His military career enabled China to survive the Jurchen invasion and, along with Yue Fei, helped to crumple the powerful Jin military. It is because of these events which led to the decline of the militaristic Jin, and the rise of Genghis Khan and the Mongols.

References
History of Song, volume 364

See also 
 Zhou Tong (archer)
 Yue Fei
 Zhang Jun (general)

1089 births
1151 deaths
12th-century Chinese poets
Burials in Suzhou
Generals from Shaanxi
Song dynasty generals
Song dynasty poets
Song dynasty politicians from Shaanxi
Poets from Shaanxi
Politicians from Yulin, Shaanxi
Writers from Yulin, Shaanxi